Barbara Pompili (born 13 June 1975) is a French politician who served as Minister of the Ecological Transition under Prime Minister Jean Castex from 2020 to 2022.

Pompili has previously served as member of the National Assembly for the 2nd constituency of Somme from 2012 to 2016 and from 2017 to 2020. A member of La République En Marche! (REM) since 2017, she was a member of The Greens (LV) from 2000 to 2010 and Europe Ecology – The Greens (EELV) from 2010 until 2015. Pompili served as Secretary of State for Biodiversity from 2016 to 2017.

Education
Born in Bois-Bernard, Pas-de-Calais, Pompili grew up in Liévin. She graduated from Sciences Po Lille.

Political career

Early career
First elected to the National Assembly in the 2012 legislative election, Pompili was the first female president of a parliamentary group in the lower house, co-leading the EELV group with François de Rugy, from 2012 until 2016. She also served on the Committee on Education and Cultural Affairs. 

In 2016, Pompili was appointed Secretary of State for Biodiversity in the government of Prime Minister Manuel Valls, under the Minister of Ecology, Ségolène Royal. She was reappointed when the government of Prime Minister Bernard Cazeneuve took office. During her time in office, she notably oversaw the entry into force of a French tax targeting palm oil and a ban on neonicotinoids in 2016. 

Pompili was an early supporter of Emmanuel Macron and the first minister in Hollande's government to openly support Macron's candidacy in the 2017 presidential election. She subsequently stood as a candidate of En Marche! (EM) in Somme's 2nd constituency, which she had represented from 2012 until 2016. She was reelected in the 2017 legislative election and subsequently served as chairwoman of the Sustainable Development, Spatial and Regional Planning Committee from 2017 until 2020. In this capacity, she led a 2018 parliamentary inquiry into France's nuclear safety and security. 

In September 2018, after François de Rugy's appointment to the government, Pompili ran for the presidency of the National Assembly. In an internal vote within the LREM parliamentary group, she came in second; the position eventually went to the group's then-president Richard Ferrand.

Minister of the Ecological Transition, 2020–2022
Pompili co-founded a new political party; En Commun in 2020.

During Pompili's time in office, France banned plastic packaging for nearly all fruit and vegetables from 2022 in a bid to reduce plastic waste.

When state-owned electric utility EDF shut down four reactors – with a combined daily capacity of 6 gigawatts (GW), equivalent to around 13 percent of current availability in France – due to technical problems in late 2021, Pompili asked the company to conduct an independent audit on the availability of its nuclear power stations.

Political positions
In July 2019, Pompili decided not to align with her parliamentary group's majority and became one of 52 LREM members who abstained from a vote on the French ratification of the European Union’s Comprehensive Economic and Trade Agreement (CETA) with Canada. She also defended amendments on the transparency and labeling of genetically modified organisms used in food products in defiance of the government's advice, as well as opposed delays in the country's strategy to reduce pesticides use and the phase-out of glyphosate.

In September 2020, Pompili publicly endorsed Aurore Bergé for the position of the LREM parliamentary group's chair; the position instead went to Christophe Castaner.

References

1975 births
Living people
People from Pas-de-Calais
Politicians from Hauts-de-France
French people of Italian descent
Women members of the National Assembly (France)
21st-century French women politicians
20th-century French women politicians
La République En Marche! politicians
Deputies of the 14th National Assembly of the French Fifth Republic
Deputies of the 15th National Assembly of the French Fifth Republic
Women government ministers of France
French political party founders